Davor Dominiković (born 7 April 1978) is a Croatian former professional handball player, who is the current handball coach for the Croatia national under-21 team & TuS Vinnhorst.

He also competed for the Croatia national team at the 2004 Summer Olympics.

Honours
Metković
Croatian First League 
Winner (1): 1999–00 (revoked)
Runner-up (2): 2000–01, 2001–02
Croatian Handball Cup (2): 2001, 2002
EHF Cup
Winner (1): 2000
Runner-up (1): 2001

Zagreb
Croatian First League (2): 1997–98, 1998–99
Croatian Handball Cup (2): 1998, 1999
EHF Champions League
Runner-up  (2): 1997–98, 1998–99

Barcelona
Liga ASOBAL (1): 2005–06
Pirenees Leagues (1): 2005–06
EHF Champions League (1): 2004–05

San Antonio
Liga ASOBAL
Runner-up  (1): 2006–07

US Ivry
French Cup 
Runner-up  (1): 2012

Individual
Franjo Bučar State Award for Sport: 2004

Orders
Order of Danica Hrvatska with face of Franjo Bučar - 2004

References

External links

1978 births
Living people
Croatian male handball players
Croatian expatriate sportspeople in Spain
Olympic handball players of Croatia
Handball players at the 2004 Summer Olympics
Handball players at the 2008 Summer Olympics
Olympic gold medalists for Croatia
Liga ASOBAL players
Sportspeople from Metković
RK Zagreb players
Olympic medalists in handball
Medalists at the 2004 Summer Olympics
Mediterranean Games gold medalists for Croatia
Competitors at the 1997 Mediterranean Games
Competitors at the 2001 Mediterranean Games
Mediterranean Games medalists in handball